Nira Pereg (born 1969) is an Israeli artist. She spent the 90s in New-York, where she received her BFA from Cooper Union at NYC. On her return to Israel, she graduated from the Bezalel MFA studio program in Jerusalem, and has been teaching internationally ever since.

Biography 

Pereg spent the 1990s in New York, where she received her BFA from Cooper Union at New York City. Returning to Israel, she graduated from the Bezalel Academy of Arts and Design MFA studio program in Jerusalem. Since then she has been teaching in several schools as Shenkar College of Engineering and Design, Ramat Gan, Israel; Karlsruhe University of Arts and Design, Germany; University of California, San Diego; and Bezalel Academy of Arts and Design, Jerusalem, Israel.

Solo exhibitions 
2018 Melt Away Before You or I Can't Believe it's Not Battle!, Laxart, Los Angeles, USA,
2017 This Red Red Stuff, Kunsthalle Darmstadt, Darmstadt, Germany
2016 Ishmael, Braverman Gallery in collaboration with ‘On Stellar Rays’, New York, USA
2015 Ishmael, Braverman Gallery, Tel Aviv, Israel
2015 The Right to Clean, Israel Museum Ticho House, Jerusalem, Israel
2015 Rights and Rites, Rose Art Museum, Boston, USA
2015 Ishmael, Art Basel, Feature Section, Basel, Switzerland
2014 Abraham Abraham & Sarah Sarah, Musée d'Art et d'Histoire du Judaïsme, Paris, France
2013 Aichi Triennale, Aichi, Japan
2013 All This Can Be Reconstructed Elsewhere, CCA - The Center for Contemporary Art, Tel-Aviv, Israel
2013 67 Bows, Museum Ein Harod, Kibuts Ein Harod, Israel
2013 Abraham & Sarah, Weatherspoon Art Museum, North Carolina, USA
2012 Kept Alive, Kunsthalle Düsseldorf, Düsseldorf, Germany
2011 Black Box Series, Hirshhorn Museum and Sculpture Garden, Smithsonian Institution, Washington, USA
2011 Sabbath, Chiado Museum, Lisbon, Portugal
2011 ArtPowe, LOFT Video Gallery, UCSD San Diego, California, USA
2010 Video of the Month, Neuer Berliner Kunstverein, Berlin, Germany
2010 LOOP Barcelona, Video-Art Fair, Barcelona, Spain
2010 Tel-Aviv Museum of Art - Winner of the Nathan Gottesdiener Foundation, Tel-Aviv, Israel
2010 Sabbath 2008, Santa Monica Museum of Art, L.A., California, USA
2010 Kept Alive, Shoshana Wayne Gallery, L.A., California, USA
2009 Sabbath 2008, Edith-Russ-Haus für Medienkunst, Oldenburg, Germany

2007 Rites and Rituals, Herzliya Museum of Contemporary Art, Herzliya, Israel
2007 Roundabout, Braverman Gallery, Tel-Aviv, Israel
2004 Canicule, Braverman Gallery, Tel-Aviv, Israel

Publications 
 Abraham Abraham Sarah Sarah. Paris: Musée d'Art et d'Histoire du Judaïsme, 2014. 
 All This Can Be Reconstructed Elsewhere. Tel-Aviv: The Center for Contemporary Art (CCA), 2013. 
 Kept Alive Monograph. Tel-Aviv: Tel Aviv Museum of Art, 2011.

Awards and residencies 
Maratier Prize 2013, Musée d'Art et d'Histoire du Judaïsme, Paris, France
Nathan Gottesdiener Foundation Israeli Art Prize’s, 2010, Tel-Aviv, Israel

Collections 
National Gallery of Canada
Centre Georges Pompidou, Paris, France 
GAM – Galleria Civica d'Arte Moderna e Contemporanea, Torino, Italy
Sammlung Goetz, München, Germany
Israel Museum, Jerusalem, Israel
Tel-Aviv Museum of Art, Tel-Aviv, Israel

References

External links 
 Official site
 Nira Pereg's Videos in Vimeo

1969 births
Living people
20th-century Israeli women artists
21st-century Israeli women artists
Jewish women artists
Artists from Tel Aviv
Israeli video artists